Philip John Smyth AM (born 11 May 1958) is an Australian former professional basketball player and coach. He won three National Basketball League (NBL) championships with the Canberra Cannons before going on to be a three-time championship-winning head coach of the NBL's Adelaide 36ers. Smyth was a four-time Olympian with the Australian national basketball team.

Professional career
Smyth, an Adelaide junior, was already seen as one of Australia's best point guards when the National Basketball League first started in 1979, yet it took him until 1982 to actually play in the league, despite having represented Australia at the 1978 FIBA World Championship in the Philippines and at the 1980 Summer Olympics in Moscow.

For personal reasons, Smyth chose not to play in the NBL until 1982 and even then, while still living in Adelaide, he signed to play with the St Kilda Saints, commuting between his home in Adelaide and Melbourne where the Saints were based. He only played for St Kilda for the 1982 NBL season, winning the NBL's Defensive Player of the Year award and selection in the NBL's First Team in the process before signing with the Canberra Cannons from 1983. At this time he also moved from Adelaide to Canberra for what would prove to be 10 seasons in Australia's capital city. During that time he enhanced his reputation as one of the best ever Australian basketball players and helped transform the Cannons into a championship winning team.

Canberra won their first NBL Championship in 1983, Smyth's first season with the club. The Cannons defeated the defending champion West Adelaide Bearcats 75–73 in the grand final. They would go on to win the championship again in 1984, this time defeating the emerging Brisbane Bullets 84–82 in another closely fought grand final win. Smyth's play during this time was a major contributor to Canberra's success. He won his second consecutive Defensive Player of the Year award in 1983 and was also a member of the ALL NBL First team in 1983, 1984, 1985, 1988 and 1989.

Smyth would win his 3rd NBL Championship when the Cannons defeated the North Melbourne Giants in the 1988 grand final series two games to one. He would also be named as the Grand Final MVP in 1988. He narrowly missed out on a fourth NBL crown in 1989 when the Giants reversed the 1988 result by defeating Canberra two games to one.

He would play on with the Cannons until the end of the 1992 NBL season when he was lured back home to Adelaide to play for the Adelaide 36ers. Despite being in the twilight of his playing career, Smyth would again be a major contributor helping the generally under-performing 36ers get back into the playoffs. Smyth played two seasons for the 36ers and would lose his second and last NBL grand final series in 1994, again to the North Melbourne Giants who defeated Adelaide 2–0 in the championship series.

After two season back home in Adelaide, Smyth had a falling out with 36ers coach Mike Dunlap who had a reputation for favouring the younger players. During 1994 Dunlap had even begun to start 3rd year player Brett Maher as the 36ers point guard and playing Smyth from the bench despite Smyth still being the starting point guard for the Australian Boomers (when Smyth questioned Dunlap on why he was benched, Dunlap told him that it was simply because he was old). This saw Smyth sign for the NBL's highest profile club, the Sydney Kings for the 1995 season where he linked with his former Canberra championship winning coach Bob Turner. In an injury interrupted season, Smyth played just 16 games for the Kings, who didn't make the playoffs. He retired from playing professional basketball after his season with the Kings.

Phil Smyth played 356 games in his NBL career, 25 with St Kilda, 282 with Canberra, 33 for Adelaide and 16 for Sydney. He averaged 22.3 points per game at 44.8%, 5.3 rebounds, 5.5 assists and 2.8 steals.

International career
Smyth represented Australia at four Summer Olympic Games (1980, 1984, 1988 and 1992), achieving a best result of 4th at the 1988 Games in Seoul where he was the team captain. He was also a member of the Boomers at the FIBA World Championships in 1978, 1982, 1986, 1990 and 1994 with a best result of 5th place in both 1982 and 1994. At the 1984 Los Angeles Olympic Games, Smyth and his wife, Jenny Cheesman, would become the first husband and wife to captain Australian teams at the same Olympics.

Coaching career
After Adelaide 36ers coach Dave Claxton failed to take the team to the playoffs in 1997, the club hired the recently retired Smyth as head coach of the team from the 1998 NBL season, the club banking on his years of experience as a player despite his only previous coaching experience being as a specialist coach at the Australian Institute of Sport (AIS) during his playing days with Canberra as well as coaching South Adelaide women's teams in the early 1980s.

Smyth's impact on the club was immediate, with the 36ers winning both the 1998 and 1998–99 NBL Championships in his first two seasons coaching in the league (according to Smyth, the 36ers coaching job in 1998 came down to himself and former North Melbourne and Brisbane coach Bruce Palmer, but the 36ers ultimately wanted someone local). The team was beaten semi finalists for the next two seasons before winning their 4th championship, and 3rd under Smyth, in 2001–02. Under his coaching the team would reach the elimination finals in 2002–03 and 2003–04 and improve to the quarters in 2004–05 and 2005–06 before failing to reach the playoffs twice which resulted in Smyth being replaced as head coach by former player and assistant Scott Ninnis.

In all, Phil Smyth coached the 36ers in the NBL for 365 games over 11 seasons, winning 205 games and losing 160.

Following his stellar international career as a player and his championship success coaching the 36ers, Smyth was appointed head coach of the Boomers in January 2001. Unfortunately his international coaching career only lasted eight months. After losing the 2001 FIBA Oceania Championship to the New Zealand Tall Blacks 1-2 the team failed to qualify for the 2002 FIBA World Championship in Indianapolis as a result. It was the first time Australia had missed out on the FIBA World Championship since making their championship debut in 1970. Smyth resigned from the job on 27 September 2001 and was ultimately replaced by the man who he defeated to win both the 1998 and 1998–99 NBL Championships, Brian Goorjian.

Media work
In March 2009 Smyth joined radio and sporting legend K. G. Cunningham to host an internet sports show KG and the General, streaming live from 3-6pm weekdays and podcast.

Honours
Smyth was made a Member of the Order of Australia in 1988, inducted into the Sport Australia Hall of Fame in 1997, and received an Australian Sports Medal in 2000.

Honour roll

NBL career stats

|-
| style="text-align:left"| 1982
| style="text-align:left;"| St. Kilda Saints
| 25 || 25 || NA || .491 || NA || .846 || 5.2 || 2.7 || NA || NA || 18.6
|-
| style="text-align:left; background:#afe6ba;"| 1983†
| style="text-align:left;"| Canberra Cannons
| 27 || 27 || NA || .498 || NA || .875 || 3.1 || 5.1 || 2.6 || 0.4 || 14.6
|-
| style="text-align:left; background:#afe6ba;"| 1984†
| style="text-align:left;"| Canberra Cannons
| 22 || 22 || NA || .450 || .461 || .873 || 3.8 || 6.1 || 2.0 || 0.2 || 14.4
|-
| style="text-align:left"| 1985
| style="text-align:left;"| Canberra Cannons
| 28 || 28 || NA || .457 || .372 || .767 || 5.6 || 5.3 || 3.4 || 0.2 || 13.3
|-
| style="text-align:left"| 1986
| style="text-align:left;"| Canberra Cannons
| 25 || 25 || NA || .407 || .341 || .888 || 5.3 || 5.0 || 3.0 || 0.4 || 12.2
|-
| style="text-align:left"| 1987
| style="text-align:left;"| Canberra Cannons
| 22 || 22 || 42.8 || .452 || .472 || .847 || 5.3 || 5.5 || 3.4 || 0.5 || 18.4
|-
| style="text-align:left; background:#afe6ba;"| 1988†
| style="text-align:left;"| Canberra Cannons
| 30 || 30 || 42.3 || .476 || .456 || .813 || 5.3 || 5.5 || 2.8 || 0.2 || 22.3
|-
| style="text-align:left"| 1989
| style="text-align:left;"| Canberra Cannons
| 28 || 28 || 44.3 || .420 || .408 || .855 || 5.6 || 4.9 || 3.3 || 0.1 || 17.4
|-
| style="text-align:left"| 1990
| style="text-align:left;"| Canberra Cannons
| 22 || 22 || 36.7 || .372 || .367 || .861 || 3.7 || 4.4 || 2.4 || 0.1 || 9.7
|-
| style="text-align:left"| 1991
| style="text-align:left;"| Canberra Cannons
| 24 || 24 || 40.9 || .390 || .373 || .852 || 3.6 || 4.7 || 2.1 || 0.2 || 15.4
|-
| style="text-align:left"| 1992
| style="text-align:left;"| Canberra Cannons
| 26 || 26 || 40.0 || .536 || .534 || .822 || 1.1 || 7.0 || 2.5 || 0.2 || 12.9
|-
| style="text-align:left"| 1993
| style="text-align:left;"| Adelaide 36ers
| 28 || 28 || 37.7 || .412 || .398 || .786 || 2.6 || 4.8 || 1.6 || 0.3 || 11.6
|-
| style="text-align:left"| 1994
| style="text-align:left;"| Adelaide 36ers
| 33 || 1 || 21.8 || .442 || .431 || .818 || 1.9 || 2.8 || 1.2 || 0.1 || 6.6
|-
| style="text-align:left"| 1995
| style="text-align:left;"| Sydney Kings
| 16 || 16 || 36.9 || .365 || .296 || .852 || 3.3 || 3.4 || 1.4 || 0.3 || 6.8
|- class="sortbottom"
| style="text-align:center;" colspan="2" | Career
| 356 || 324 || NA || .448 || .416 || .839 || 4.2 || 4.8 || 2.3 || 0.2 || 13.9
|}

Coaching record

NBL

|- 
| align="left" |Adelaide 36ers
| align="left" |1998
|30||19||11|||| align="center" |2nd ||4||4||0||
| align="center" |Champions
|-class="sortbottom"
|- 
| align="left" |Adelaide 36ers
| align="left" |1998–99
|26||18||8|||| align="center" |1st ||7||6||1||
| align="center" |Champions
|-class="sortbottom"
|- 
| align="left" |Adelaide 36ers
| align="left" |1999–00
|28||22||6|||| align="center" |1st ||3||1||2||
| align="center" |Semi-finalists
|-class="sortbottom"
|- 
| align="left" |Adelaide 36ers
| align="left" |2000–01
|28||16||12|||| align="center" |6th ||6||3||3||
| align="center" |Semi-finalists
|-class="sortbottom"
|- 
| align="left" |Adelaide 36ers
| align="left" |2001–02
|30||17||13|||| align="center" |3rd ||8||6||2||
| align="center" |Champions
|-class="sortbottom"
|- 
| align="left" |Adelaide 36ers
| align="left" |2002–03
|30||16||14|||| align="center" |5th ||3||1||2||
| align="center" |Elimination-Finalists
|-class="sortbottom"
|- 
| align="left" |Adelaide 36ers
| align="left" |2003–04
|33||14||19|||| align="center" |8th ||1||0||1||
| align="center" |Elimination-Finalists
|-class="sortbottom"
|- 
| align="left" |Adelaide 36ers
| align="left" |2004–05
|32||19||13|||| align="center" |5th ||1||0||1||
| align="center" |Quarter-finalists
|-class="sortbottom"
|- 
| align="left" |Adelaide 36ers
| align="left" |2005–06
|31||18||13|||| align="center" |4th ||1||0||1||
| align="center" |Quarter-finalists
|-class="sortbottom"
|- 
| align="left" |Adelaide 36ers
| align="left" |2006–07
|33||11||22|||| align="center" |11th ||—||—||—||—
| align="center" |Missed playoffs
|-class="sortbottom"
|- 
| align="left" |Adelaide 36ers
| align="left" |2007–08
|30||14||16|||| align="center" |9th ||—||—||—||—
| align="center" |Missed playoffs
|-class="sortbottom"
| align="left" |Career
| ||331||184||147|||| ||34||21||13||

References

External links
KG and the General 

1958 births
Living people
1986 FIBA World Championship players
Adelaide 36ers coaches
Adelaide 36ers players
Australian men's basketball coaches
Australian men's basketball players
1978 FIBA World Championship players
1982 FIBA World Championship players
1990 FIBA World Championship players
Basketball players at the 1980 Summer Olympics
Basketball players at the 1984 Summer Olympics
Basketball players at the 1988 Summer Olympics
Basketball players at the 1992 Summer Olympics
Canberra Cannons players
Members of the Order of Australia
National Basketball League (Australia) coaches
Olympic basketball players of Australia
Point guards
Recipients of the Australian Sports Medal
Sport Australia Hall of Fame inductees
Basketball players from Adelaide
Sydney Kings players
1994 FIBA World Championship players